Samuel Julian Ard (February 14, 1939April 2, 2017) was an American professional stock car racing driver. He won two NASCAR Budweiser Late Model Sportsman Series championships, in 1983 and 1984. Ard also made one NASCAR Winston Cup start. He retired from driving after being injured in late 1984 and became a car owner. He battled Parkinson's in the later stages of his life and died in April 2017 at age 78.

Racing career

Late Model Sportsman Division 1975-1981
Ard was a regular competitor, earning at least nine wins and scoring multiple top-five finishes.
In 1981, Ard finished fifth in the season-long NASCAR National Championship point standings.

Late Model Sportsman / Busch Grand National Series
Ard was the runner-up in 1982 of NASCAR's Late Model Sportsman Series, winning four races and finishing out of the top ten only six times. 

On the heels of that season, Ard won ten races and had twenty-three top five finishes and won the 1983 Busch Grand National (now Nascar Xfinity Series) points championship.

He continued his dominant streak in 1984, with eight wins and twenty-four top fives in 28 starts. Ard was seriously injured in a crash at the Rockingham Speedway on October 20, 1984. Despite missing the season's final race at Martinsville, Ard captured the Busch Grand National championship for the second year in a row, but was never able to race again.

Winston Cup Series 
Ard made his first and only Winston Cup Series start on September 23, 1984 at Martinsville. He started 27th in the 31-car field, but lasted just one lap before a steering failure ended his day.

Post-racing career 
After retiring as a driver, Ard became an owner, fielding cars for several drivers, most notably Jimmy Hensley and Jeff Burton, who claimed his first Grand National win driving Ard's car.

Later life and death 
Ard battled Alzheimer's disease and Parkinson's disease. His family often received donations and aid from the racing community to help him. In 2006, drivers Kevin Harvick and Dale Earnhardt Jr. led a charge to donate a substantial amount of funds for the care of Ard and his family. After tying Ard's Nationwide Series single-season victory record in 2008, Kyle Busch announced that he would give $100,000 to aid Ard's family with his care and mounting medical expenses in his honor.

Ard died on April 2, 2017 at the age of 78.

Personal life 
Ard served in the Vietnam War as a member of the U. S. Air Force. He married his wife Jo in 1961, and they had four children.

Motorsports career results

NASCAR
(key) (Bold – Pole position awarded by qualifying time. Italics – Pole position earned by points standings or practice time. * – Most laps led.)

Winston Cup Series

 Ard's team was a post-entry for the race and thus did not receive points.

Busch Series

ARCA Permatex SuperCar Series
(key) (Bold – Pole position awarded by qualifying time. Italics – Pole position earned by points standings or practice time. * – Most laps led.)

References

External links

NASCAR Budweiser/Busch Late Model Sportsman Series Win List at The Crittenden Automotive Library

1939 births
2017 deaths
American Speed Association drivers
NASCAR drivers
NASCAR Xfinity Series champions
People from Florence County, South Carolina
Racing drivers from South Carolina
ARCA Menards Series drivers